Minority Floor Leader might refer to:

 Minority Floor Leader of the Senate of the Philippines
 Minority Floor Leader of the House of Representatives of the Philippines

See also
 Floor leader
 Majority Floor Leader of the Senate of the Philippines
 Majority Floor Leader of the House of Representatives of the Philippines